Lomas de Campos is a municipality located in the province of Palencia, Castile and León, Spain.
According to the 2014 census, the municipality has a population of 53 inhabitants.

See also
Tierra de Campos

References

External links
 Pablo Garcia Comenares, Los usos públicos de la Historia: La memoria de la represión de la guerra civil en Palencia (1936-1939) - PITTm, número 76, 
Exhumación en el cementerio de Lomas de Campos (Palencia)

Municipalities in the Province of Palencia